
In molecular biology, mir-221 microRNA (and its paralogue, mir-222) is a short RNA molecule. MicroRNAs function to regulate the expression levels of other genes by several mechanisms.

mir-221 is an oncogenic microRNA. It targets CD117, which then prevents cell migration and proliferation in endothelial cells. 
miR-221 is known as an anti angiogenic miRNA. 
Recent important studies have reported that miR-221 is also involved in induction of angiogenesis.
RNA induced Silencing Complex (RISC) proteins SND1 and AEG-1 induces miR-221 expression in Liver cancer.
In liver cancer miR-221 induces the tumor angiogenesis. miR-221 detection in human faeces can be a non-invasive screening marker for colorectal cancer.

See also 
 MicroRNA

References

Further reading

External links
 

MicroRNA
Non-coding RNA